The Knights of the Round Table are the order of knights associated with King Arthur in the Arthurian legend.

Knights of the Round Table may also refer to:

Knights of the Round Table (film), a 1953 British film based on the Arthurian legend
Knights of the Round Table (role-playing game), a 1976 role-playing game based on the Arthurian legend

See also
Round Table
Knights of the Round